HMS Chivalrous was one of thirty-two  destroyers built for the Royal Navy during the Second World War, a member of the eight-ship Ch sub-class. Commissioned in 1946, she was built as a flotilla leader with additional accommodation for staff officers. The ship was loaned to the Pakistani Navy during the late 1950s and was sold for scrap in 1961 after being returned.

Design and description
The Ch sub-class was a repeat of the preceding Ca sub-class, except that the addition of remote control for the main-gun mounts caused some of the ships' intended weapons to be removed to save weight.

The ships were powered by a pair of geared steam turbines, each driving one propeller shaft using steam provided by two Admiralty three-drum boilers. As a flotilla leader, Chivalrouss complement was 222 officers and ratings.

The main armament of the destroyers consisted of four QF  Mk IV dual-purpose guns, one superfiring pair each fore and aft of the superstructure protected by partial gun shields. Their anti-aircraft suite consisted of one twin-gun stabilised Mk IV "Hazemeyer" mount for  Bofors guns and two single 2-pounder (40 mm) AA guns amidships, and single mounts for a  Oerlikon AA gun on the bridge wings. To compensate for the weight of the remote control equipment, one of the two quadruple 21-inch (533 mm) torpedo tube mounts was removed and the depth charge stowage was reduced to only 35. The ships were fitted with a pair of rails and two throwers for the depth charges.

Construction and career
Chivalrous was originally intended to be ordered from Vickers-Armstrongs' shipyard in Barrow-in-Furness, but that facility was overloaded with work and the contract was switched to William Denny & Brothers. The ship was laid down on 27 November 1943 at its Dumbarton shipyard, launched on 22 June 1945 and was commissioned on 13 May 1946.

She formed part of the 14th (later 1st) Destroyer Squadron for service in the Mediterranean. She saw service, along with other Royal Navy ships in preventing illegal immigration into Palestine in 1947.

History in the Pakistan Navy

Chivalrous was loaned to the Pakistan Navy on 29 June 1954 and renamed Taimur. She was returned to the Royal Navy and scrapped in 1961.

Citations

Bibliography
 
 
 
 
 
 
 
 

 

C-class destroyers (1943) of the Royal Navy
Ships built on the River Clyde
1945 ships
World War II destroyers of the United Kingdom
Cold War destroyers of the United Kingdom
C-class destroyers (1943) of the Pakistan Navy